Deliathis buqueti is a species of beetle in the family Cerambycidae. It was described by Tasté in 1841, originally under the genus Taeniotes. It is known from Honduras, Belize, and Mexico. It contains the varietas Deliathis buquetii var. mira.

References

Lamiini
Beetles described in 1841